38628 Huya, provisional designation , is a binary trans-Neptunian object located in the Kuiper belt, a region of icy objects orbiting beyond Neptune in the outer Solar System. Huya is classified as a plutino, a dynamical class of trans-Neptunian objects with orbits in a 3:2 orbital resonance with Neptune. It was discovered by the Quasar Equatorial Survey Team and was identified by Venezuelan astronomer Ignacio Ferrín in March 2000. It is named after Juyá, the mythological rain god of the Wayuu people native to South America.

Huya's surface is moderately red in color due to the presence of complex organic compounds on its surface. Water ice has been suspected to be also present on its surface, although water ice has not been directly detected on Huya. Huya is considered to be a possible dwarf planet, though its relatively small size and dark surface may imply that it never collapsed into a solid body and was thus never in hydrostatic equilibrium.

Huya has one known natural satellite, designated S/2012 (38628) 1. The satellite is relatively large compared to Huya and is expected to have slowed its rotation, although measurements of Huya's brightness variations have indicated that Huya's rotation may not be synchronous with the satellite's orbit.

History

Discovery 
Huya was discovered on 10 March 2000 by a team of astronomers of the Quasar Equatorial Survey Team (QUEST), led by Gustavo Bruzual and Charles Baltay at the Llano del Hato National Astronomical Observatory in Mérida, Venezuela. Huya was first identified by Venezuelan astronomer Ignacio Ferrín during a computer-assisted search through images taken from a six-hour survey of deep-sky objects including quasars and supernovae, using the Llano del Hato National Astronomical Observatory's 1-meter Schmidt telescope on the night of 15 March 2000. At the time of discovery, Huya was located in the constellation of Virgo. The subtle movement of Huya was detected by the QUEST's computer program, which was designed to identify moving objects by superimposing multiple images. The discovery team subsequently analyzed earlier images taken from previous QUEST surveys conducted during the same month in order to verify the orbital motion of Huya.

The discovery of Huya was formally announced by the Minor Planet Center in a Minor Planet Electronic Circular on 3 June 2000. It was given the provisional designation  which indicates its year of discovery, with the first letter further specifying that the discovery took place in the first half of March. The last letter and numbers of its designation indicate that Huya is the 4327th object discovered in the first half of March. At that time, Huya was thought to be one of the largest minor planets in the Solar System due to its apparent magnitude of 20, which is relatively bright for a distant object. This implied that it might be around one-fourth the size of Pluto and comparable in size to the dwarf planet . Baltay, leader of the discovery team and chairman of Yale University's Department of Physics, proclaimed that the discovery was significant because it was the largest object discovered in the Kuiper belt since Pluto in 1930. In an interview on their discovery, Baltay asserted: 

After the announcement of Huya's discovery, the discovery team found precovery images of Huya taken with the Palomar Observatory's Samuel Oschin telescope on 9 April 1996. These precovery images of Huya from Palomar are the earliest known observations of Huya. The precovery images along with subsequent follow-up observations in 2000 extended Huya's observation arc up to four years, which helped refine Huya's orbit. By 2002, Huya was observed 303 times. This was sufficient to accurately determine its orbit, so was assigned the minor planet number 38628 to Huya on 28 March 2002.

Name 
This minor planet is named after the mythological figure Huya (Juyá), the rain god of the Wayuu people indigenous to the Guajira Peninsula of northern Venezuela and Colombia. In Wayuu mythology, Juyá is a hunter who controlled the rain and was married to Pulowi, the female figure related to the wind and dry seasons. Juyá is also associated with the winter and lives in the celestial altitudes beyond the sun. The discovery team led by Ferrín particularly chose the name to represent Venezuela's indigenous peoples that lived in the region where Huya was discovered. Ferrín presumed that Huya had experienced multiple impact events during its formation, which he considered analogous to rain, a trait associated with Juyá.

While searching for names, Ferrín and his team had agreed upon a naming scheme based on indigenous names with traits that are associated with the object's characteristics. Among 20 potential names considered by Ferrín's team, they chose the name Juyá, altered to its equivalent phonetic English spelling Huya. The name was later submitted and proposed to the International Astronomical Union (IAU), which then approved the name in 2003. The Minor Planet Center published the naming citation on 1 May 2003. Although the IAU's present naming convention for minor planets requires objects in the orbital class of plutinos (objects in 3:2 orbital resonance with Neptune) to be named after underworld deities, these guidelines had not yet been established when Huya was named.

Orbit 

Huya is in a 2:3 mean-motion orbital resonance with Neptune, meaning that Huya completes two orbits around the Sun for every three orbits completed by Neptune. Due to its 2:3 orbital resonance with Neptune, Huya is classified as a plutino, a dynamical class of objects with orbits similar to that of Pluto. Huya's orbit is inclined to the ecliptic by 15.5 degrees, slightly less than Pluto's orbital inclination of 17 degrees. It has an elongated orbit with an orbital eccentricity of 0.28. Due to its eccentric orbit, its distance from the Sun varies over the course of its orbit, ranging from 28.5 AU at perihelion (closest distance) to 51.1 AU at aphelion (farthest distance). Like Pluto, its resonance with Neptune prevents close approaches between Huya and the giant planets. The minimum orbit intersection distance (MOID) between Huya and Neptune is 1.45 AU, but due to the resonance, the two never come closer than 21 AU of each other.

Huya has passed perihelion in 2015, and is now moving away from the Sun, approaching aphelion by 2149. , Huya is approximately 28.8 AU from the Sun, located in the direction of the constellation Ophiuchus. Simulations by the Deep Ecliptic Survey (DES) show that Huya can acquire a perihelion distance (qmin) as small as 27.27 AU over the next 10 million years.

Physical characteristics

Size 

This initial size estimate of Huya made it one of the largest trans-Neptunian objects known at that time, ranking as the second-largest minor planet after Ceres. Subsequent measurements of Huya's thermal emission yielded higher albedo estimates for Huya, consequently corresponding to smaller diameter estimates.

Early estimates for Huya's diameter were calculated from its apparently high absolute magnitude (brightness), was later discovered to be the combination of the brightnesses of the primary body (Huya) and its large satellite, whose existence was unknown until its discovery in 2012. By subtracting the satellite's effects from Huya's brightness, astronomers were able to approximate Huya's true diameter. Compared to Pluto and its moon Charon, Huya is approximately one-sixth the diameter of Pluto and one-third the diameter of Charon.

On 18 March 2019, Huya occulted a bright 10.6-magnitude star, briefly dimming the star as Huya passed in front of it. The stellar occultation was observed by astronomers across central Europe and Asia and was detected by 21 telescopes at 18 observation sites in the region. Successful detections of the occultation yielded 14 chords from Romania, three chords from Turkey, and three chords from Israel. No signs of a possible atmosphere or rings were detected during the occultation, with strong constraints put on the amount of debris in the vicinity of Huya. Rings with a width smaller than 0.1 km, or an opacity of less than 50 percent, remain possible.

Possible dwarf planet status 
Huya was considered to be a possible dwarf planet due to its presumed high brightness, which corresponds to a large diameter. However, later measurements of Huya's diameter yielded smaller size estimates, casting doubt on this possibility. Huya is situated at the lower end of the size range, implying that Huya's interior structure is likely highly porous and undifferentiated since its formation and thus is unlikely to be in hydrostatic equilibrium. Based on a 2019 stellar occultation, Santos-Sanz et al. found a density of about  if Huya is a Maclaurin spheroid, and  if it is a Jacobi ellipsoid; however, the occultation found no evidence of an irregular shape for Huya, with their 2022 paper describing the Plutino as being at least consistent with "a very round object".

Spectra and surface 
The reflectance spectrum of Huya appears moderately red and featureless in the infrared spectrum, lacking apparent absorption signatures of water ice and other volatile materials. The scattered disc object  shares a similarly featureless spectrum with Huya, though their visible colors differ. Huya's featureless spectrum indicates that its surface is covered with a thick layer of dark organic compounds irradiated by solar radiation and cosmic rays. Although water ice appears to be absent in Huya's infrared spectrum, some astronomers have detected subtle signs of water ice in its visible spectrum in 2011 and 2017. The discrepancy of the presence of water ice between the visible and infrared spectra of Huya was interpreted as an indication of heterogeneity in Huya's surface composition. Huya's surface is homogeneously covered with trace amounts of water ice, as subtle water ice absorption features recur in multiple observations of Huya's visible spectrum over the course of its rotation. Early observations of Huya's spectrum in 2000 have identified a red spectral slope at wavelengths around 0.7 μm, typical of dark trans-Neptunian objects. Additional near-infrared absorption features were also identified, and were attributed to the presence of aqueously altered silicate minerals on Huya's surface.

The red color of Huya's surface results from the irradiation of organic compounds by solar radiation and cosmic rays, which produces dark, reddish tholins that cover its surface. Huya's featureless spectrum indicates that its surface is covered with a thick layer of dark organic compounds irradiated by solar radiation and cosmic rays. Compared to the large Kuiper belt object , which displays apparent signs of water ice, Huya's spectrum appears redder and featureless, suggesting that its surface is covered with a thick layer of tholins concealing water ice underneath. It is thought that the layer of surface tholins on Huya is thicker than that of Varuna, as a result of a more intense radiation environment. Best-fit models for these absorption features suggest that Huya's surface consists of a mixture of cometary ice tholins (ice tholin II), nitrogen-rich Titan tholins, as well as water ice.

Spectrographic observations of Huya's spectrum with the Very Large Telescope in 2001 and 2002 have tentatively identified weak absorption features at near-infrared wavelengths around 0.6–0.82 μm, possibly indicating the presence of phyllosilicate materials on its surface. The 0.6 μm absorption feature in Huya's spectrum resembles those in the spectra of stony S-type asteroids, which may suggest the presence of spinel group minerals, albeit in trace amounts as such minerals are unlikely to be abundant in trans-Neptunian objects. Other absorption features near 0.7 μm in Huya's spectrum appear akin to those in the spectra of dark asteroids, indicating the presence of hydrous silicate minerals such as phyllosilicates, which may have been aqueously altered through heating induced by impact events or the radioactive decay of radionuclides in Huya's interior. However, later observations of Huya's spectrum did not find any absorption features related to aqueously altered material, suggesting that they are likely concentrated in a small, localized area of Huya's surface.

Brightness 
Huya has a visual absolute magnitude (H) of 5.04 and a low geometric albedo of 0.083. Its apparent magnitude, the brightness as seen from Earth, varies from 19.8 to 21.6 magnitudes. Huya comes to opposition in June of each year at a visual apparent magnitude of 19.8. At wavelengths of the R-band range, Huya appears brighter in red light, with its R-band apparent magnitude reaching 19.11 magnitudes at opposition. At the time of Huya's discovery, it was thought to be one of the brightest trans-Neptunian objects known, which corresponded to an initially large size estimate for Huya as it appeared relatively bright for a distant object. As Huya comes to opposition, its brightness increases as a result of an opposition surge, in which its phase angle approaches zero. In 2001, long-term photometric observations of Huya were conducted to observe its opposition surge behavior and attempted to identify any indication of variability in Huya's brightness. The results showed a gradual increase in brightness near opposition, indicating a low geometric albedo. Huya became the first trans-Neptunian object other than Pluto to have its opposition surge measured. Huya appeared to display very little variability in brightness, with an estimated light curve amplitude of less than 0.097 magnitudes.

Rotation 
The rotation period of Huya is unknown due to the flat appearance of its light curve, displaying very little variability in brightness. Preliminary photometric observations of Huya in 2000 have reported no indication of variability greater than three percent of its brightness over a period of 1.25 hours. Follow-up photometric observations of Huya at opposition in 2001 yielded a similarly flat light curve, with an estimated amplitude of less than 0.097 magnitudes. The small amplitude of Huya's light curve suggests that it may be oriented in a pole-on configuration, with its rotational axis pointing toward Earth. The discovery of a large satellite around Huya implies that it could be tidally locked to its satellite, although the satellite's orbit is unknown. While Huya's rotation is expected to slow down on a timescale that is short compared to the age of the Solar System through mutual tidal forces with its satellite, several photometric observations of Huya indicate a variability of several hours, suggesting that Huya may not be tidally locked to its satellite.

Their inferred rotation period was derived from data sets of short-term photometry taken separately in February and March 2002. However, the rotation period determined by Ortiz was later determined to be an alias of Huya's brightness variability. In 2014, Thirouin suggested a shorter fragmentary rotation period of 5.28 hours, tentatively determined from short-term photometric observations conducted in 2010 through 2013. Like the former rotation period inferred by Ortiz, the latter period obtained by Thirouin was based on fragmentary photometric data and may be erroneous by a factor of 30 percent or more.

Exploration 
In a study published by Ashley Gleaves and colleagues in 2012, Huya was considered as a potential target for an orbiter mission that would be launched on an Atlas V 551 or Delta IV HLV rocket. For an orbiter mission to Huya, the spacecraft would have a launch date in November 2027 and use a gravity assist from Jupiter, taking 20 to 25 years to arrive. For a flyby mission to Huya, planetary scientist Amanda Zangari calculated that a spacecraft could take just under 10 years to arrive at Huya using a Jupiter gravity assist, based on a launch date of 2027 or 2032. Huya would be approximately 31 to 37 AU from the Sun when the spacecraft arrives by 2040. Alternative trajectories using gravity assists from Jupiter, Saturn, or Uranus have been also considered. A trajectory using gravity assists from Jupiter and Uranus could take at least 20 years, based a launch date of 2038 or 2039, whereas a trajectory using a gravity assist from Saturn could take over 16 years, based on a later launch date of 2040. Using these alternative trajectories for the spacecraft, Huya would be approximately 37 to 38 AU from the Sun when the spacecraft arrives before 2060.

Satellite 

S/2012 (38628) 1 is the provisional designation for the only known satellite of Huya. It was discovered by a team led by Keith Noll in Hubble Space Telescope observations obtained on 6 May 2012, and confirmed in reexamination of archival Hubble Space Telescope imagery from 30 June and 1 July 2002. The discovery was reported to the International Astronomical Union and was announced on 12 July 2012. From Hubble images of Huya, the satellite's separation distance from the primary is estimated to be at least .

Characteristics 
The satellite is 1.4 magnitudes dimmer than Huya (HV=5.04), giving a visual absolute magnitude of 6.44 for the satellite. The size ratio of the satellite to the primary is 0.525. The large size ratio is analogous to the Pluto–Charon binary system, in which Pluto's large moon Charon is large and massive enough such that the center of mass (barycenter) is located in the space between Charon and Pluto. The Huya system may be in a similar case, although no information about its barycenter is known. With a large size compared to Huya, the satellite is expected to have slowed Huya's rotation such that both components become mutually tidally locked, although several photometric observations of Huya indicate a rotation period of several hours, suggesting that Huya may not be tidally locked to its satellite.

The orbit of the satellite is poorly known due to the small number of resolved observations of Huya's satellite. Consequently, a definitive mass and density estimate for Huya cannot be derived from the satellite's orbit. Astrometry of the satellite's changing position around Huya from two Hubble images taken one day apart in 2002 indicates a rough orbital period estimate of about 3.2 days.

Notes

References

External links 
 Beyond Jupiter: The World of Distant Minor Planets – (38628) Huya
 Object: 38628 Huya (2000 EB173)  (Raw Hubble images of Huya)
 Planet 10? Tiny 'Plutino' Almost Qualifies
 'Mini-Pluto' spotted orbiting the Sun
 

038628
Binary trans-Neptunian objects
038628
Discoveries by Ignacio Ramón Ferrín Vázquez
Named minor planets
038628
20000310